William Henry Hodgkinson (1883–unknown) was an English footballer who played in the Football League for Derby County.

References

1883 births
English footballers
Association football forwards
English Football League players
Hinckley Town F.C. players
Derby County F.C. players
Year of death missing